The Chatsworth Head is a slightly over-life-size bronze head dating to around 460 BCE which is now in the British Museum.

Description
The head was originally part of a complete statue, probably (judging by the shoulder-length curly hair) one of Apollo, made up of various sections (e.g. head, arms, legs, some of the locks of hair) produced separately by lost-wax casting then joined into one whole - a leg from the same sculpture is in the Louvre (Br 69).  Its eyes probably originally held glass, marble or ivory inlays, which were held in with surviving bronze plates, which curl outwards to form eyelashes.  Its lips seem to have been plated with reddish copper to imitate their natural colour.

Discovery
In 1834, the Louvre managed to purchase the first large bronze statue found in modern times after its discovery in Italy near the Island of Elba. Two years later a complete statue was discovered near Tamassos on Cyprus and was immediately retrieved by locals who dragged it from its position using oxcarts. During its journey the statue fell apart losing legs, arms and its torso.

Provenance
The head was acquired by the 6th Duke of Devonshire at Smyrna from H.P. Borrell in 1838. The other parts of the statue were lost, but it is believed that a leg in the Louvre was originally part of this statue.

The 6th Duke of Devonshire and his successors kept it at their residence of Chatsworth House, from which it takes its name.  It was loaned to the Fitzwilliam Museum in the mid-1930s, and was acquired from the 11th Duke by the British Museum in 1958.  It has the British Museum catalogue reference 1958 0418 1 and is on show there, in Room 15.

Notes

References
D.E.L. Haynes, The technique of Greek Bronze (Mainz am Rhein, 1992)
C.C. Mattusch, Greek Bronze statuary (Cornell University Press, 1988)
L. Burn, The British Museum book of G-1, revised edition (London, The British Museum Press, 1999)

Further reading
Dafas, K. A., 2019. Greek Large-Scale Bronze Statuary: The Late Archaic and Classical Periods, Institute of Classical Studies, School of Advanced Study, University of London, Bulletin of the Institute of Classical Studies, Monograph, BICS Supplement 138 (London), pp. 126-129, pls 137-145.

External links
Bronze head of Apollo: the 'Chatsworth Head', British Museum
A. J. B. Wace, 'The Chatsworth Head', The Journal of Hellenic Studies, Vol. 58, Part 1 (1938), pp. 90-95
1836 archaeological discoveries
Apollo
Ancient Greek and Roman sculptures in the British Museum
5th-century BC Greek sculptures
Ancient Greek bronze statues of the classical period